The U.S. and World Population Clock presents the United States Census Bureau's continuously active approximations of both the population of the United States and the world's total population. The population totals are based on the latest census information and national population estimates, which are used in the algorithms that run the two clocks.

Calculation
The calculation used to estimate the approximate timely population is;

one birth per time TW- one death per time TX+ one international immigrant per time TY= overall increase (one person per time TZ).

Example
One birth every 1 minute and 56 seconds - One death every 3 minutes and 59 seconds+ One international migrant every 3 minutes and 11 seconds= One person every 1 minute and 8 seconds

External Links
 World Population Clock

Demographics of the United States
Clocks
United States Census Bureau